Events from the year 1855 in Canada.

Incumbents
Monarch — Victoria

Federal government
Parliament — 5th

Governors
Governor General of the Province of Canada — Edmund Walker Head

Premiers
Joint Premiers of the Province of Canada —
Canada West Premier
Sir Allan Napier MacNab, until May 24, 1856
Sir John A. Macdonald, from May 24, 1856
Canada East Premier 
Sir Étienne-Paschal Taché

British North America Colonies
Colonial Governor of Newfoundland — Charles Henry Darling
Premier of Newfoundland — Philip Francis Little
Governor of Nova Scotia — John Gaspard Le Marchant
Premier of Nova Scotia — William Young
Governor of New Brunswick — John Manners-Sutton
Premier of New Brunswick — Charles Fisher
Governor of Prince Edward Island — Dominick Daly
Premier of Prince Edward Island — John Holl

Events
 British Empire's Crimean War continues, British troops being withdrawn
 Albert Salter surveys the North Shore of Lake Huron, following the signing of the Robinson-Huron Treaty in 1850.
January 1 – Bytown is renamed Ottawa.
March 8 – A bridge over the Niagara River near Niagara Falls is completed
April 11 – The Militia Act of 1855 is passed in the Parliament of the Province of Canada
April 17 – Charlottetown incorporated as a city
May 19 - The Militia Act is proclaimed
August 17 – The Charlottetown Police Department is established
August 31 – The First Volunteer Militia units are formed, by year end 21 Companies have been formed.
November 19 – The first section of the Grand Trunk Railway's original Toronto–Montreal mainline is completed between Montreal and Brockville.

Full date unknown
1855 Newfoundland general election

Births

January 14 – Homer Watson, artist (died 1936)
February 22 – Grace Annie Lockhart, first woman in the British Empire to receive a Bachelor's degree (died 1916)
March 5 – Nérée Le Noblet Duplessis, politician, 19th Mayor of Trois-Rivières and father of 16th Premier of Quebec Maurice Duplessis (died 1926)
May 11 – Charles Doherty, politician and jurist (died 1931)
July 29 – Bowman Brown Law, politician (died 1916)
August 3 – Charles Hibbert Tupper, politician (died 1927)
September 12 – Simon-Napoléon Parent, politician and Premier of Quebec (died 1920)
December 14 – William Brymner, art teacher and painter (died 1925)

Deaths
July 7 – Henry Sherwood, lawyer, local politician and 4th Premier of Canada West (born 1802)

References

 
Canada
Years of the 19th century in Canada
1855 in North America